"E.O.I.O" (aka "Eeo-Eio" and "Io... Aio") is a song written by Lynsey de Paul (credited as Rubin) and Edward Adamberry, and published by Chappell. It was originally released as a single by the group the Beads on the Decca label in October 1971. This was one of the earliest records produced by Peter Collins; he also wrote the B-side "Sweetie Peetie". The single was released in the UK and most territories in Europe, as well as Turkey and Lebanon.

Actor and singer Jack Wild recorded a version of the song, produced by Biddu, for his 1972 album A Beautiful World. It was released on Buddah Records in the US and received a positive review from Billboard. A version with Italian text by Dino Sarti called "Io... Aio" was also released by the Italian group, Domodossola, a vocal and instrumental Italian group named after their birthplace, on their 1971 album D... Come Domodossola.

References

Songs written by Lynsey de Paul
1971 singles
1971 songs